This Time It's Personal is the second studio album by American contemporary R&B group Somethin' for the People, released September 23, 1997 via Warner Bros. Records. Co-produced and primarily written by the group, it was their first album to chart on the Billboard 200, peaking at #154. The album also reached #33 on the Billboard R&B chart.

Three singles were released from the album: "My Love Is the Shhh!", "Think of You" and "All I Do". "My Love Is the Shhh!" was the group's only hit on the Billboard Hot 100, peaking at #4 in 1997. In addition to original songs, the album contains a cover of "She's Always in My Hair" by Prince.

Track listing

Chart positions

Samples

References

External links
 
 

1997 albums
Somethin' for the People albums
Warner Records albums